Gord Miller or Gordon Miller may refer to:

People
Gord Miller (politician) (1924–2021), Canadian politician
Gord Miller (sportscaster) (born 1965), Canadian sportscaster
Gord Miller (environmental commissioner) (born 1953), Canadian politician
Gordon Miller (athlete) (born 1939), British high jumper

Fictional characters
Gordon Miller (Neighbours)